Robert Harwood Sturgeon (August 6, 1919 – March 10, 2007) was a shortstop and second baseman in Major League Baseball who played between 1940 and 1948 for the Chicago Cubs (1940–1942,  1946–1947) and Boston Braves (1948). He was born in Clinton, Indiana.

Sturgeon was one of many major leaguers who saw his baseball career interrupted when he joined the US Navy during World War II (1942–45). His most productive season came for the 1946 Cubs, when he posted a career-high .296 batting average.
 
In a six-season career, Sturgeon was a .257 hitter (313-for-1220) with one home run and 80 RBI in 420 games played, including 106 runs, 48 doubles, 12 triples and seven stolen bases.

Sturgeon died in San Dimas, California, at age 87.

External links

1919 births
2007 deaths
Albuquerque Cardinals players
United States Navy personnel of World War II
Baseball players from Indiana
Boston Braves players
Chicago Cubs players
Columbus Red Birds players
Edmonton Eskimos (baseball) players
Fargo-Moorhead Twins players
Jersey City Giants players
Los Angeles Angels (minor league) players
Major League Baseball second basemen
Major League Baseball shortstops
Minor league baseball managers
Sacramento Solons players
Salt Lake City Bees players
Seattle Rainiers players
Ventura Braves players
Victoria Athletics players
Long Beach Polytechnic High School alumni